Nebria germarii is a species of ground beetle in the Nebriinae subfamily that can be found in Austria, Germany, Italy, Liechtenstein, Switzerland, and in every state of former Yugoslavia, except for North Macedonia.

References

Beetles described in 1837
Beetles of Europe